Barvaj (also Romanized as Barooj, Barvach, Barvadzh, and Barwaj; also known as Darvaj) is a village in Chuqur Rural District, Tarom Sofla District, Qazvin County, Qazvin Province, Iran. At the 2006 census, its population was 53, in 12 families.

References 

Populated places in Qazvin County